was a Japanese-American landscape architect who designed acclaimed Japanese garden installations. He was a graduate of the University of California, Berkeley, and Kyoto University.

Works 
Born in Osaka, Uesugi's prominent works include:

 The James Irvine Garden at the Japanese American Cultural and Community Center, Little Tokyo, Los Angeles
 The Huntington Japanese Garden at the Huntington Library in San Marino, California
 The Gardens of Belief at the City of Hope National Medical Center
 The Japan Pavilion at the Expo '70, Suita, Osaka
 The Hotel Nikko (now Grand Hyatt Atlanta in Buckhead) in Atlanta, Georgia
 The Japanese Friendship Garden Expansion at Balboa Park
 The Washington Center in Washington D.C.
 The George and Sakaye Aratani Japanese Garden on the campus of Cal Poly Pomona

Honors 
Uesugi's honors include the National Landscape Award presented by First Lady Nancy Reagan in a 1981 White House ceremony that recognized his design of the James Irvine Garden. This garden is widely regarded as one of the finest public spaces in Los Angeles. In 2010, he was awarded the Order of the Sacred Treasure, Gold Rays with Neck Ribbon, from the Government of Japan to honor his work fostering the development of Japanese gardens throughout the world.  As such, he joined an elite group of recipients including fellow Japanese American landscape architect and designer Isamu Noguchi.

Uesugi was the president of his own landscape design firm and a professor emeritus in landscape architecture at Cal Poly Pomona's College of Environmental Design where he helped establish an exchange program with Kyushu University.

References

External links
 JACCC James Irvine Garden
 USC Public Art in LA Summary of Irvine Garden
 Virtual Tour of the George and Sakaye Aratani Japanese Garden
 Japanese Friendship Garden Construction Progress
 Takeo Uesugi & Associates home page

1940 births
2016 deaths
American landscape and garden designers
Japanese gardeners
American gardeners
American landscape architects
Japanese landscape architects
People from Osaka
Japanese emigrants to the United States
American people of Japanese descent
California State Polytechnic University, Pomona alumni
California State Polytechnic University, Pomona faculty
UC Berkeley College of Environmental Design alumni
People associated with the Huntington Library